Animal studies is a recently recognised field in which animals are studied in a variety of cross-disciplinary ways. Scholars who engage in animal studies may be formally trained in a number of diverse fields, including geography, art history, anthropology, biology, film studies, geography, history, psychology, literary studies, museology, philosophy, communication, and sociology. They engage with questions about notions of "animality," "animalization," or "becoming animal," to understand human-made representations of and cultural ideas about "the animal" and what it is to be human by employing various theoretical perspectives. Using these perspectives, those who engage in animal studies seek to understand both human-animal relations now and in the past as defined by our knowledge of them. Because the field is still developing, scholars and others have some freedom to define their own criteria about what issues may structure the field.

History
As an interdisciplinary subject, animal studies exists at the intersection of a number of different fields of study. Different fields began to turn to animals as an important topic at different times and for various reasons, and these separate disciplinary histories shape how scholars approach animal studies. Historically, the field of environmental history has encouraged attention to animals.

In part, animal studies developed out of the animal liberation movement and was grounded in ethical questions about co-existence with other species: whether it is moral to eat animals, to do scientific research on animals for human benefit, and so on. Animal studies scholars who explore the field from an ethical perspective frequently cite Australian philosopher Peter Singer's 1975 work, Animal Liberation, as a founding document in animal studies.  Singer's work followed Jeremy Bentham's by trying to expand utilitarian questions about pleasure and pain beyond humans to other sentient creatures.

Theorists interested in the role of animals in literature, culture, and Continental philosophy also consider the late work of Jacques Derrida a driving force behind the rise of interest in animal studies in the humanities.  Derrida's final lecture series, The Animal That Therefore I Am, examined how interactions with animal life affect human attempts to define humanity and the self through language. Taking up Derrida's deconstruction and extending it to other cultural territory, Cary Wolfe published Animal Rites in 2003 and critiqued earlier animal rights philosophers such as Peter Singer and Thomas Regan. Wolfe's study points out an insidious humanism at play in their philosophies and others. Recently also the Italian philosopher Giorgio Agamben published a book on the question of the animal: The Open. Man and Animal.

Research topics and methodologies
Researchers in animal studies examine the questions and issues that arise when traditional modes of humanistic and scientific inquiry begin to take animals seriously as subjects of thought and activity.  Students of animal studies may examine how humanity is defined in relation to animals, or how representations of animals create understandings (and misunderstandings) of other species. In order to do so, animal studies pays close attention to the ways that humans anthropomorphize animals, and asks how humans might avoid bias in observing other creatures. For instance, Donna Haraway's book, Primate Visions, examines how dioramas created for the American Museum of Natural History showed family groupings that conformed to the traditional human nuclear family, which misrepresented the animals' observed behavior in the wild. Critical approaches in animal studies have also considered representations of non-human animals in popular culture, including species diversity in animated films.

By highlighting these issues, animal studies strives to re-examine traditional ethical, political, and epistemological categories in the context of a renewed attention to and respect for animal life. The assumption that focusing on animals might clarify human knowledge is neatly expressed in Claude Lévi-Strauss's famous dictum that animals are "good to think."

See also 
 Intersectionality
 Anthrozoology (human–animal studies)
 Animality studies
 Critical animal studies
 Ecocriticism
 Ecosophy

References

Bibliography
 Bjorkdahl, Kristian, and Alex Parrish (2017) Rhetorical Animals: Boundaries of the Human in the Study of Persuasion. Lantham: Lexington Press. ISBM 9781498558457.
Boehrer, Bruce, editor, A Cultural History of Animals in the Renaissance, Berg, 2009, .

 
 
De Ornellas, Kevin (2014). The Horse in Early Modern English Culture, Fairleigh Dickinson University Press, .

 
 
Kalof, Linda (2017). The Oxford Handbook of Animal Studies.  Oxford: Oxford University Press.  .

External links
  Animal Studies Journal
 Animal Rights History
 Animal Studies and Film: An interview with Matthew Brower, professor of graduate Art History at York University
 http://www.animalstudies.msu.edu/bibliography.php/ Animal Studies Online Bibliography]
 Animals and the Law
 Australian Animal Studies Group
 Italian Animal Studies Review

Animal Studies at Michigan State University

Animal testing
Animal rights
Social sciences
Behavioural sciences
Art history
Art criticism